Shrikanth Narayanan is an Indian-American Professor at the University of Southern California. He is an interdisciplinary engineer-scientist with a focus on human-centered signal processing and machine intelligence with speech and spoken language processing at its core. A prolific award-winning researcher, educator, and inventor, with hundreds of publications and a number of acclaimed patents to his credit,  he has pioneered several research areas including in computational speech science, speech and human language technologies, audio, music and multimedia engineering, human sensing and imaging technologies, emotions research and affective computing, behavioral signal processing, and computational media intelligence. His technical contributions cover a range of applications including in defense, security, health, education, media, and the arts. His contributions continue to impact numerous domains including in human health (notably, mental and behavioral health such as addiction, developmental disorders such as Autism), national defense/intelligence, and the media arts including in using technologies that facilitate awareness and support of diversity and inclusion. His award-winning patents have contributed to the proliferation of speech technologies on the cloud and on mobile devices and in enabling novel emotion-aware artificial intelligence technologies.

Career
Shri Narayanan was born in New Delhi, India (1967), and grew up in Madras (Chennai). He received his bachelor's degree in Electrical Engineering from the College of Engineering-Guindy in 1988 and was recognized with its 2019 Distinguished Alumnus Award. He is a notable Alumnus from the University of California, Los Angeles, from where he  obtained both an M.S. in 1990, Engineer in 1992, and Ph.D. in 1995, and was the recipient of 2011 Engineering Alumni Professional Achievement Award from UCLA. His early career was at AT&T Bell Laboratories, Murray Hill, and AT&T Research.

He is the University Professor, holder of the inaugural Niki and C. L. Max Nikias Chair in Engineering and was the inaugural holder of the Andrew J. Viterbi Professorship in Engineering (2007-2016) at the University of Southern California (USC), where he holds appointments in Departments of Electrical & Computer Engineering, Computer Science, Linguistics, Psychology, Neuroscience, Pediatrics and Otolaryngology-Head & Neck Surgery. He is the founder and director of the USC Signal Analysis and Interpretation Laboratory (SAIL), and the Ming Hsieh Institute, a research director for the USC Information Sciences Institute, and is a member of the Signal and Image Processing Institute. In 2013, he co-founded the company Behavioral Informatix, LLC., which ultimately led to the founding of Behavioral Signal Technologies, Inc. He also co-founded Lyssn, Inc. in 2017.

Notable professional honors and positions 
Shri Narayanan is a fellow of the National Academy of Inventors, International Speech Communication Association (ISCA), the Acoustical Society of America (ASA) in 2005, the Institute of Electrical and Electronics Engineers (IEEE), the American Association for the Advancement of Science (AAAS), and the Association for Psychological Science (APS) and the American Institute for Medical and Biological Engineering (AIMBE). He was elected a Distinguished Lecturer by the IEEE Signal Processing Society and the International Speech Communication Association, and served as the American Speech-Language-Hearing Association (ASHA)’s  Willard Zemlin Lecturer in 2017. 
He was awarded the Guggenheim fellowship in 2022. 
His work has been presented in numerous distinguished and keynote lectures worldwide. He also currently serves as an Editor for the Computer, Speech and Language Journal (2008–present), having served as editor-in-chief of the IEEE Journal on Selected Topics in Signal Processing (2016–present) (2016–2018), and as an Associate Editor for numerous journals. 

He has won numerous research and best paper awards including two IEEE Signal Processing Society Best Transactions Paper awards (2005, 2009), an International Speech Communication Association Journal paper award (2018), six Interspeech Challenge awards, a 2015 Ten Year Technical Impact Award from ACM ICMI, a 2015 Distinguished Engineering Educator Award and a 2020 Sustained Accomplishment Award from ACM ICMI.

His work has been widely featured in national and international print and broadcast media including the NY Times, LA Times, The Time of London, The Washington Post, the Wall Street Journal, Financial Times, CNN, ABC, NBC, Fox, BBC and Wired. He was named by LA Weekly as one of their "fascinating angelenos" for their People 2013 issue.

Behavioral Signal Technologies
Shri Narayanan co-founded Behavioral Signal Technologies Inc. in 2016 with colleagues Alex Potamianos and Prem Natarajan. The company specializes in emotion recognition in speech, predictive and omni-channel behavioural analytics applying Behavioral Signal Processing (BSP) technologies in diverse industries. He serves as its Chief Scientist.

As a precursor to this, Shri Narayanan had co-founded the company Behavioral Informatix in 2013 with his colleagues Matt Black and Alex Potamianos The company specializes in using Behavioral Signal Processing (BSP). The company specializes in using Behavioral Signal Processing (BSP) techniques to help personalize user experiences and assist in decision-making for the healthcare industry.

Lyssn
Shri Narayanan co-founded Lyssn in 2017, a technology company focused on mental health care delivery, treatment and quality assurance, and is its Chief Science Officer.

References
29. https://www.newsindiatimes.com/several-indian-americans-among-2022-guggenheim-fellows/

1967 births
Living people
Electrical engineering academics
Fellows of the Acoustical Society of America
University of California, Los Angeles alumni
Fellow Members of the IEEE
Fellows of the American Association for the Advancement of Science
Speech processing researchers
People from New Delhi
University of Southern California faculty
Indian emigrants to the United States
American people of Indian descent